Kennedy Kimwetich (born 1 January 1973) is a retired Kenyan middle distance runner who specialised in the 800 metres. He reached the final of the 1999 World Championships finishing seventh.

He is the Kenyan record holder in the indoor 1000 metres. This is also the current Commonwealth records.

Competition record

Personal bests
Outdoor
800 metres – 1:43.03 (Stuttgart 1998)
1000 metres – 2:13.56 (Nice 1999)
Indoor
800 metres – 1:46.26 (Karlsruhe 2000)
1000 metres – 2:15.50 (Stuttgart 2000) NR

References

1973 births
Living people
Kenyan male middle-distance runners
Athletes (track and field) at the 1998 Commonwealth Games
Commonwealth Games competitors for Kenya
Athletes (track and field) at the 1999 All-Africa Games
African Games competitors for Kenya
20th-century Kenyan people